The 1973 Paris–Nice was the 31st edition of the Paris–Nice cycle race and was held from 11 March to 17 March 1973. The race started in Paris and finished in Nice. The race was won by Raymond Poulidor of the Gan team.

General classification

References

1973
1973 in road cycling
1973 in French sport
1973 Super Prestige Pernod